The Faculty of Business and Economics (new: RWTH Aachen University School of Business and Economics) is one of nine faculties at the RWTH Aachen University. It was found in 1986. Approximately 1,500 students are enrolled in the faculty. It was renamed in RWTH Aachen University School of Business and Economics in 2011.

The RWTH Aachen University's School of Business and Economics is accredited by AACSB since 2011.-

Degrees awarded

The following Degrees are awarded in business administration or macroeconomics:

 Bachelor of Science
 Master of Science
 Master of Education
 Doctor

Reputation

According to the 2020 CHE University Ranking, the Faculty of Economics one of the 15 strongest research departments of business administration in Germany. The School of Business and Economics is in the 2012 Handelsblatt BWL ranking among the top ten of the German faculties, and in the top 15 German speaking faculties.

Partner Universities

 Belgien-Université de Liège
 China-Tsinghua University Beijing
 China-Tongji University
 China-University of Science and Technology Beijing
 Dänemark-University of Aarhus
 England-INSEEC Business School London
 Finland-Aalto University
 Finland-Lappeenranta University of Technology
 Frankreich-Business School INSEEC Paris
 Frankreich-Université Catholique de Lille
 Frankreich-Université Jean Moulin Lyon
 Frankreich-Business School INSEEC Bordeaux
 Italien-Università degli Studi di Torino
 Korea-Kyung Hee University
 Litauen-Vilnius Gediminas Technical University
 Niederlande-Maastricht University School of Business and Economics
 Norwegen-Norwegian University of Science and Technology Trondheim
 Schweden-Chalmers University Göteborg
 Slowakei-University of Economics in Bratislava
 Spanien-Universidad de Cantabria
 Spanien-Universitat Internacional de Catalunya
 Spanien-Universität CEU San Pablo in Madrid
 Thailand-Chulalongkorn University
 Türkei-Dokuz Eylül Üniversitesi
 USA-Western Washington University, Bellingham

References

External links
 School of Business and Economics (German version)
 School of Business and Economics (English version)

RWTH Aachen University